971 Alsatia, provisional designation , is a carbonaceous background asteroid from the central region of the asteroid belt, approximately  in diameter. It was discovered on 23 November 1921, by French astronomer Alexandre Schaumasse at Nice Observatory in southeastern France. The asteroid was named after the French province Alsace.

Orbit and classification 

Alsatia is a non-family asteroid of the main belt's background population when applying the Hierarchical Clustering Method to its proper orbital elements. It has also been dynamically classified as a member of the Eunomia family, which has a different spectral type though. This suggests that Alsatia may be an interloper to that family.

It orbits the Sun in the central main-belt at a distance of 2.2–3.1 AU once every 4 years and 4 months (1,569 days). Its orbit has an eccentricity of 0.16 and an inclination of 14° with respect to the ecliptic.

Physical characteristics 

In the SMASS classification, Alsatia is a carbonaceous C-type asteroid.

Rotation period 

Several rotational lightcurves of Alsatia have been obtained from photometric observations by Robert Stephens (2000), Laurent Bernasconi (2005), astronomer at the Oakley Southern Sky Observatory (2011), Brian Warner (2011), and Daniel Klinglesmith (2017). Lightcurve analysis gave a consolidated rotation period of 9.614 hours with a brightness amplitude of 0.17 to 0.29 magnitude.

Diameter and albedo 

According to the surveys carried out by the Infrared Astronomical Satellite IRAS, the Japanese Akari satellite and the NEOWISE mission of NASA's Wide-field Infrared Survey Explorer, Alsatia measures between 55.31 and 64.724 kilometers in diameter and its surface has an albedo between 0.0403 and 0.05.

The Collaborative Asteroid Lightcurve Link adopts the results obtained by IRAS, that is, an albedo of 0.0415 and a diameter of 63.75 kilometers based on an absolute magnitude of 10.05.

Naming 

This minor planet was named after the French province Alsace (regained from Germany after the WWI) in northeast France between the Rhine river and the Vosges mountains. In 1922, the discoverer proposed the name Alsace. However, the Astronomical Calculation Institute, then responsible for the naming of minor planets, changed the name in Alsatia. The political status of Alsace has been heavily influenced by historical decisions, wars, and strategic politics.

Notes

References

External links 
 Asteroid Lightcurve Database (LCDB), query form (info )
 Dictionary of Minor Planet Names, Google books
 Asteroids and comets rotation curves, CdR – Observatoire de Genève, Raoul Behrend
 Discovery Circumstances: Numbered Minor Planets (1)-(5000) – Minor Planet Center
 
 

000971
Discoveries by Alexandre Schaumasse
Named minor planets
000971
19211123